Limbs is the second album by British musician Keeley Forsyth, released in February 2022. It was produced by Forsyth and Ross Downes. The album received critical acclaim upon its release.

Track listing

 "Fires" – 3:38
 "Bring Me Water" – 3:55
 "Limbs" – 2:56
 "Land Animal" – 3:22
 "Blindfolded" – 2:48
 "Wash" – 3:24
 "Silence" – 3:19
 "I Stand Alone" – 2:57

References

2022 albums
The Leaf Label albums